Roy Gibson (born 4 July 1924) is a former Director General of ESRO, and the first Director General of ESA, serving from 1975 until 1980.

Early years 
Gibson was born in Manchester on 4 July 1924 and educated at Chorlton High School and at the Universities of Oxford and London (London School of Economics).

Early in World War II, Gibson joined the Home Guard, although under-age, and subsequently joined the Army as a volunteer at age 18. After officer training at Catterick and commissioning into the Royal Signals, he served with Mountbatten's headquarters in India and Ceylon from 1944 during the Burma Campaign. Late in the campaign, Gibson was posted to Akyab Island and then to Rangoon immediately after the Japanese had evacuated from there.

He served in the British Colonial Administrative Service in Malaya from 1948 to 1958.

Career 
He returned to London to work at the UK Atomic Energy Authority until 1967. He became Deputy Director of the ESRO Technical Centre (ESTEC), until 1971 when he became Director of Administration for ESRO. From 1974 he was Acting Director General of ESRO, and oversaw the transition of the two previous organisations ESRO and ELDO to form the European Space Agency (ESA) in 1975.

Gibson was the first Director General of the British National Space Centre from 1985 to 1987. From 1987 to 1992 he worked at INMARSAT, and then at EUMETSAT. Since then he has served as an aerospace consultant to the ESA and the EU Commission, and has worked on the setting up of the European Environment Agency.

In 1977, Gibson received the Grand Decoration of Honour in Silver with Star for Services to the Republic of Austria

References

Sources
 European Space Agency

External links
 Listen to an oral history interview with Roy Gibson - a life story interview recorded for the National Life Stories project Oral History of British Science at the British Library

1924 births
Living people
People from Chorlton-cum-Hardy
European Space Agency personnel
Alumni of the London School of Economics
Recipients of the Grand Decoration with Star for Services to the Republic of Austria
Royal Corps of Signals officers
British Home Guard soldiers
British Army personnel of World War II
Scientists from Manchester
British people in colonial India
British expatriates in Sri Lanka